The golden age of alpinism was the decade in mountaineering between Alfred Wills's ascent of the Wetterhorn in 1854 and Edward Whymper's ascent of the Matterhorn in 1865, during which many major peaks in the Alps saw their first ascents.

Prominent figures
With its beginning slightly predating the formation of the Alpine Club in London in 1857, the golden age was dominated by British alpinists and their Swiss and French guides. Prominent figures of the period include Lord Francis Douglas, Paul Grohmann, Florence Crauford Grove, Charles Hudson, E. S. Kennedy, William Mathews, A. W. Moore, John Ball, Leslie Stephen, Francis Fox Tuckett, John Tyndall, Horace Walker and Edward Whymper. Well-known guides of the era include Christian Almer, Jakob Anderegg, Melchior Anderegg, Johann Joseph Bennen (fr), Peter Bohren, Jean-Antoine Carrel, Michel Croz, Ulrich Kaufmann and Johannes Zumtaugwald.  Lucy Walker, sister of Horace, attained some notable firsts during the period, including the first ascent of the Balmhorn (1864), and later several first female ascents.

In the early years of the "golden age", scientific pursuits were intermixed with the sport. More often than not, the mountaineers carried a variety of instruments up the mountain with them to be used for scientific observations. The physicist John Tyndall was the most prominent of the scientists. Among the non-scientist mountaineers, the literary critic Leslie Stephen was the most prominent. In the later years of the "golden age", the non-scientist pure sportsmen came to dominate the London-based Alpine Club and alpine mountaineering overall.

First ascents in the golden age 
 1854 Königspitze, Ostspitze (Monte Rosa), Strahlhorn
 1855 Mont Blanc du Tacul, Westspitze (Monte Rosa), Weissmies
 1856 Aiguille du Midi, Allalinhorn, Lagginhorn
 1857 Mönch,  Monte Pelmo
 1858 Dom, Eiger, Hinterer Brochkogel, Nadelhorn, Piz Morteratsch, Vorderer Brochkogel, Wildstrubel
 1859 Aletschhorn, Bietschhorn, Grand Combin, Grivola, Rimpfischhorn, Hochalmspitze, Monte Leone
 1860 Alphubel, Blüemlisalphorn, Civetta, Gran Paradiso, Grande Casse
 1861 Castor, Fluchthorn, Lyskamm, Mont Pourri, Monte Viso, Schreckhorn, Weisshorn, Weißkugel
 1862 Dent Blanche, Dent Parrachée, Doldenhorn, Gross Fiescherhorn, Monte Disgrazia, Ramolkogel, Täschhorn, Zuckerhütl
 1863 Antelao, Bifertenstock, Dent d'Hérens, Parrotspitze, Piz Zupò, Tofane
 1864 Adamello, Aiguille d'Argentière, Aiguille de Tré la Tête, Balmhorn, Barre des Écrins, Dammastock, Gross Wannenhorn, Marmolata, Mont Dolent, Pollux, Presanella, Sorapiss, Zinalrothorn
 1865 Aiguille Verte, Grand Cornier, Großer Möseler, Hochfeiler, La Ruinette, Matterhorn, Monte Cristallo, Ober Gabelhorn, Piz Buin, Piz Roseg

See also

List of first ascents
Exploration of the High Alps
Silver age of alpinism

References

Sources
 Hermann Alexander Berlepsch (1861), The Alps; or, Sketches of life and nature in the mountains (English translated from German by Leslie Stephen).
 Trevor Braham (2004), When the Alps Cast Their Spell: Mountaineers of the Golden Age of Alpinism (publisher: In Pinn)
 Ronald Clark (1953), The Victorian Mountaineers (220 pages).
 John Tyndall, (1871), Hours of Exercise in the Alps (475 pages).

Alpine Club (UK)
Alpinism
History of the Alps
History of mountaineering
Mountaineering in the Alps
Mountaineering in the United Kingdom